The Euroformula Open Championship (formerly the Spanish Formula Three Championship, European F3 Open Championship) is a junior formula racing series based in Spain. It was one of six national and international Formula Three championships in Europe and Scandinavia that together used to form an important part of the established "career ladder" below Formula One. The championship's first season was held in 2001. In 2006, it was branded as the Spanish F3 Championship by Toyota, in deference to its sole engine supplier. In 2020, the championship ceased to be a F3-championship and will share its specifications with Japan's Super Formula Lights based on the previous-generation Formula Three standards, primarily with a choice of engines.

Profile
The Spanish Formula Three Championship was formed during Spain's recent growth period in motor racing that began with the Euro Open Movistar by Nissan, which eventually became the World Series by Renault when the two companies' motor racing programs were reorganised. The new championship replaced the previously existing Super Formula Toyota, a one-make series with performance similar to F3.

The European F3 Open championship has become successful by actively taking measures to control budget requirements. This provides a more achievable option for drivers who lack the major sponsorship portfolio that is required by leading Euroseries teams, and would otherwise have to look elsewhere for their next step up the career ladder.

With Renault's backing, the World Series has developed into a championship from which drivers can reach Formula One, and three major Spanish teams are established in GP2. This has fostered new opportunities for the graduates of Spanish F3, which has, in turn, made the championship itself a success.

In recent years the Championship has become much less centred in Spain, with races across Europe, and has successfully attracted famous non-Spanish teams to take part. The first was the British outfit Team West-Tec who went on to win two Driver's Championship titles in their first three seasons, and which were followed a year later by Italy's RP Motorsport who have won races each year since joining.

The championship was renamed to Euroformula Open Championship for 2014, after the FIA restricted the use of the Formula Three name to championships that do not follow the current engine regulations.

Sub-divisions
Like British Formula Three, the series incorporates a second championship class for chassis specifications from the previous generation. The Copa was created in 2005, and provides an opportunity for drivers without competitive budgets, who would otherwise be left unable to progress from cheaper formulae. The name is derived from the chassis specification that all Copa entrants must use: the Dallara F308.

Equipment
The Euroformula Open Championship has used chassis from Italian constructor Dallara. During the first seasons, the Dallara F300 was used. The Dallara F305 debuted in 2005, the Dallara F308 in 2008, and the Dallara F312 in 2012. The secondary class was dropped during the 2014 season due to lack of entries. The current chassis is the Dallara 320, which debuted in 2020.

Originally, the European F3 Open Championship had a single engine supplier. From 2010 to 2018, the series used Toyota's F3 engine upgraded by the Spanish tuner Piedrafita Sport. In 2019, the series also allowed Mercedes-Benz and Volkswagen engines, and the Toyota engines were dropped after the first round of the season.

F1 tests
The exclusive use of the Toyota engine prompted Toyota to offer a Formula One test to each year's champion. The first driver to benefit from this was 2004 champion Borja García, who later graduated to GP2.

Venues
Between 2001 and 2005, the Spanish F3 Championship had seven rounds, each with two races. Exceptions to this included the Valencia round in 2002 and the Jerez round in 2003, each of which had only one race, and Albacete, which held a single-race event in addition to its regular two-race event in 2005.

In every season from its inception until 2007, the championship made a regular visit to Estoril in Portugal. The 2006 season, which was expanded to eight rounds, included the championship's first visit to Magny-Cours in France.

Since 2008 many circuits from further afield have been added to the schedule including visits to Magny Cours, Donington Park and Brands Hatch with major European motorsport venues including Spa, Monza, Silverstone and Hungaroring hosting rounds of the 2014 season as the series expands further into Europe.

From 2001, the circuits used in the Euroformula Open Championship are listed as:

 Bold denotes a circuit will be used in the 2023 season.

Points system

Champions

Spanish Formula Three

Drivers

Teams

Junior Cup

Trofeo Ibérico

Copa de España de F3

European F3 Open

Drivers

Teams

Copa F306/300

Euroformula Open

Drivers

Teams

Rookies

Spanish F3 Drivers

Spanish F3 Teams

Notes

References

External links
Euruformula Open Official Website
Speedsport on Spanish F3
Formula3.cc
European F3 Open Championship at forix.com

 
2001 establishments in Spain
Recurring sporting events established in 2001
Formula Three series